Events from the year 1750 in Sweden

Incumbents
 Monarch – Frederick I

Events

Births

 18 July - Prince Frederick Adolf of Sweden, prince (died 1803)
 19 July - Johan Gabriel Oxenstierna, poet (died 1818) 
 8 October - Adam Afzelius, botanist and an apostle of Carl Linnaeus (died 1837)

Deaths

 29 January - Sophia Schröder, concert soprano  (born 1712)
 25 April - Olof Hiorter, astronomer (born 1696) 
 17 May - Georg Engelhard Schröder, painter (born 1684)

References

External links

 
Years of the 18th century in Sweden
Sweden